Group C of the 2017 Africa Cup of Nations was played from 16 to 24 January 2017 in Gabon. The group consisted of defending champions Ivory Coast, Morocco, DR Congo, and Togo.

DR Congo and Morocco advanced to the round of 16 as the top two teams.

Teams

Notes

Standings

In the quarter-finals:
The group winners, DR Congo, advanced to play the runners-up of Group D, Ghana.
The group runners-up, Morocco, advanced to play the winners of Group D, Egypt.

Matches
All times are local, WAT (UTC+1).

Ivory Coast vs Togo

DR Congo vs Morocco

Ivory Coast vs DR Congo

Morocco vs Togo

Morocco vs Ivory Coast

Togo vs DR Congo

References

External links
2017 Africa Cup of Nations, CAFonline.com

Group C
Africa